Terrible de la Côte Ouest Boeny is a Malagasy football club. The team is based in the region of Boeny.

Achievements
 Coupe de Madagascar: 1
 2012

Performance in CAF competitions
CAF Confederation Cup: 1 appearance
2013 -

Football clubs in Madagascar